Martina Navratilova was the defending champion and successfully defended her title, defeating Monica Seles in the final, 6–2, 7–6(8–6).

Seeds
The top eight seeds received a bye to the second round.

Draw

Finals

Top half

Section 1

Section 2

Bottom half

Section 3

Section 4

References
 Drawsheet

1991 WTA Tour
Virginia Slims of Palm Springs - Singles